Lindblad Cove is a cove,  wide, between Almond Point and Auster Point in Charcot Bay, Trinity Peninsula, Antarctica. It was named by the Advisory Committee on Antarctic Names in 1995 in commemoration of Lars-Eric Lindblad, a pioneer in Antarctic tourism. A noted conservationist, Lindblad operated the first cruise to Antarctica in 1966 and was a leader in the concept of expedition tourism as a means of environmental awareness.

References

Coves of Graham Land
Landforms of Trinity Peninsula